Teinoptila brunnescens is a moth of the  family Yponomeutidae. It is found in China (Yunnan), India and Nepal.

External links
Taxonomic study of the genus Teinoptila Sauber, 1902 from China (Lepidoptera: Yponomeutidae)

Yponomeutidae